The 2002 Reading Borough Council election was held on 2 May 2002, at the same time as other local elections across England. Sixteen of the 45 seats on Reading Borough Council were up for election, being the usual third of the council (15 seats) plus a by-election in Redlands ward, where Labour councillor Rajinder Sohpal had resigned. No seats changed party at the election, and the council therefore continued to have a Labour majority, with David Sutton continuing as leader of the party and the council.

Results

Ward results
The results in each ward were as follows:

References

2002 English local elections
2002